Gavin Pattison Pfuhl (27 August 1947 – 1 April 2002) was a South African first-class cricketer who played for Western Province. He was a wicketkeeper who took more than 300 dismissals in his 95-game career.

Pfuhl was a member of the Currie Cup-winning Western Province sides of 1969–70, 1974–75 and 1977–78.

After retiring he became a cricket commentator in South Africa. He died aged 54 after suffering a viral complication from a heart transplant.

External links
 
 Gavin Pfuhl at CricketArchive

1947 births
2002 deaths
Western Province cricketers
South African cricketers
South African cricket commentators
Wicket-keepers